

This is a list of the National Register of Historic Places listings in Miami, Florida.

This is intended to be a complete list of the properties and districts on the National Register of Historic Places in Miami, Florida, United States. The locations of National Register properties and districts for which the latitude and longitude coordinates are included below, may be seen in an online map.

There are 189 properties and districts listed on the National Register in Miami-Dade County, including 6 National Historic Landmarks. Miami is the location of 77 of these properties and districts, including 5 National Historic Landmarks; they are listed here, while the remaining properties and districts are listed separately. One property, the Venetian Causeway, is split between Miami and Miami Beach, and is thus included on both lists.  Another 3 sites were once listed, but have been removed.

Current listings

|}

Former listings

|}

See also

 List of National Historic Landmarks in Florida
 National Register of Historic Places listings in Florida

References

 
Miami-related lists
Miami
Miami, Florida